The Cavistrau is a mountain consisting of two summits in the Glarus Alps, overlooking Brigels and Trun in canton of Graubünden. The mountain belongs to the Brigelser Hörner, of which Cavistrau Grond (3251 m) is the highest and Cavistrau Pign (3219 m), just 230 metres to its east side, the second highest. To its northern side above Val Frisal lies a nameless firn field.

The Cavistrau Grond is the highest mountain of the Glarus Alps lying entirely in Graubünden. The border with the canton of canton of Glarus is located a few kilometres north, across Val Frisal.

References

Mountains of the Alps
Alpine three-thousanders
Mountains of Switzerland
Mountains of Graubünden
Trun, Switzerland
Breil/Brigels